Donald L. Bryant Junior (born 1942) is an American businessman, art collector, vineyard owner and philanthropist. He is the chairman emeritus of The Bryant Group, a St. Louis-based wealth management firm. His Bryant Family Vineyards in Napa, California produces some of the country's most highly-rated wines.

Early life and education

Bryant graduated from Denison University in Ohio in 1964, and from the Washington University School of Law in 1967.

Career
He is owner of Bryant Family Vineyard, a boutique winery in Napa, California, and The Bryant Group, an executive compensation and wealth management firm in St. Louis, Missouri.  As a vintner, he purchased his first vineyard in the late 1980s and initially replanted it entirely with cabernet sauvignon vines to both reflect the terroir of California and the traditions from Bordeaux.

Art collection 
Bryant moved to London for a year when he was 51 in order to study art history. He toured 47 different museums and employed a curator from Tate Museum to teach him about  twentieth century art.  He later became a trustee of the Tate; as well as being formerly on the Board of Trustees of MoMA in New York. He has several times been named among the world's top 200 collectors by ARTnews magazine. The Bryant collection includes works by Jasper Johns, Willem de Kooning,  Jackson Pollock, Alberto Giacometti, Jean Dubuffet, Robert Rauschenberg, Ellsworth Kelly, and others. An Andy Warhol portrait of Marlon Brando, purchased by Bryant for $5 million just a decade before, was sold by Bryant in 2013 for $23.7 million.

In 1999, Bryant purchased Christopher Wool's painting Apocalypse Now, but sold it two years later to Christie's chairman François Pinault, allegedly because his wife could not live with a work that said "SELL THE HOUSE SELL THE CAR SELL THE KIDS".

Personal life
Bryant's marriage to Barbara Bryant ended in divorce in 2007. The couple had three children. In April 2009, he married Bettina Sulser Bryant, an art consultant and former ballet dancer, with the couple reportedly living in New York.

References

External links

American art collectors
Denison University alumni
Washington University School of Law alumni
Businesspeople from St. Louis
People from the Upper East Side
1942 births
Place of birth missing (living people)
Living people